Vincent Boussard (born 21 April 1969) is a French opera and theatre director. First a specialist for early opera, he became known for his versions of romantic operas, sometimes in international collaboration. His staging of Massenet's Manon was presented at the Vilnius National Opera, the San Francisco Opera and the Korea National Opera. His production of Bellini's I puritani was shown at the Opéra Royal de Wallonie and the Oper Frankfurt.

Career 
Born in Angers, Boussard studied at the Paris Nanterre University and graduated as a Master of Theatre. He was the assistant to several directors in theatre and opera. From 1996 to 2000, he directed the Studio-Théâtre de la Comédie-Française in Paris, where he made his directorial debut in 1999.

Since 2001, he has focused on staging operas, with regular collaborators Christian Lacroix for costumes, Vincent Lemaire for stage design and Guido Levi for light design.

His operatic beginning is marked by close collaborations with William Christie, Teresa Berganza and Bernard Foccroulle, director of the Théâtre Royal de la Monnaie (Brussels) who has regularly invited him.

His productions have since been widely distributed in Europe, including Staatsoper Unter den Linden, Strasbourg Opera House, Liceu of Barcelona, Théâtre du Capitole de Toulouse, Hamburg State Opera. La Monnaie in Brussels, Theater an der Wien, Royal Swedish Opera, Semperoper in Dresden, Saint Gall Theater, Bayerische Staatsoper, Aalto Theatre, and the Opéra de Marseille. He has staged operas in Asia, such as New National Theatre Tokyo, and in the US, including the Brooklyn Academy of Music. He has collaborated with conductors such as Yves Abel, Rinaldo Alessandrini, Lionel Bringuier, Paolo Carignani, Riccardo Frizza, Patrick Fournillier, Daniel Harding, René Jacobs, Alexander Joel, Alessandro De Marchi, Wayne Marshall, Carlo Montanaro, Andreas Spering and Christian Thielemann, among others. He is also invited by festivals such as the Salzburg Easter Festival, Aix-en-Provence Festival, Innsbruck Festival of Early Music, Festival dei due mondi in Spoleto, and Festival Amazonas de Ópera. In international collaboration, his staging of Massenet's Manon began in 2015 at the Vilnius National Opera, and was later also presented at the San Francisco Opera and the Korea National Opera. His production of Bellini's I puritani was jointly shown at the Opéra Royal de Wallonie in Liège and the Oper Frankfurt.

He also stages singers' shows like Christophe (La Route des Mots – 2002) and Alain Bashung (La Tournée des grands espaces – 2004).

In 2009, he was appointed a knight in the Ordre des Arts et des Lettres.

Staging

Theatre 
 1998: Le Glossaire  by Max Rouquette, Studio-Théâtre de la Comédie-Française.
 1999: Escurial, trois acteurs, un drame...  after Michel de Ghelderode, Studio-Théâtre de la Comédie-Française.

Opera 
 2000:  Charpentier: Actéon and Purcell: Dido and Aeneas, les Arts Florissants (cond. William Christie), Paris and New York
 2001: Mozart: Così fan tutte, Escuela Reina Sofia (cond. Teresa Berganza)
 2001: Handel: Theodora, Teatro Liceo de Salamanca, Teatro Arriaga de Bilbao
 2001: Le Jardin des Voix (1st edition), les Arts Florissants
 2002: Charpentier: La descente d'Orphée aux enfers, Les Arts Florissants
 2003:  (after Henri Büsser), Opera studio of the Opéra National de Lyon
 2003: Mozart: Il re pastore, La Monnaie, Brussels
 2003: Divertimento Berganza, Opéra Comique, Paris
 2003: Bizet: Le docteur Miracle, Opera studio of the Opéra de Lyon
 2004: Cavalli: Eliogabalo, La Monnaie
 2005: Le Jardin des Voix (2nd edition), Les Arts Florissants
 2005: Cimarosa: Il matrimonio segreto, Chapelle Reine Elisabeth, La Monnaie
 2006: Mozart: Così fan tutte, La Monnaie
 2006: Menotti: Maria Golovin, Opéra de Marseille
 2006: Mozart: Don Giovanni, Innsbruck Festival of Early Music, Baden-Baden Festival
 2007: Benoît Mernier; Frühlings Erwachen, La Monnaie
 2007: Mozart: Le nozze di Figaro, Aix-en-Provence Festival
 2007: Mazzocchi: La Catena d'Adone, Flanders Opera Studio
 2008: Menotti: Maria Golovin, Festival Amazonas de Opera, Manaus
 2008: Tonadilla, Festival de teatro classico, Almagro
 2008: Pasquini: Sant'Agnese, Innsbruck Festival of Early Music
 2008: Debussy: Pelléas et Mélisande, Flanders Opera Studio
 2009: Le Jardin des Voix (4th edition), les Arts Florissants
 2009: Handel: Floridante, Handel Festival, Halle
 2009: Charpentier: Louise, Opéra national du Rhin, Strasbourg
 2010: Handel: Agrippina, Staatsoper Unter den Linden, Berlin
 2010: Purcell: Dido and Aeneas, Brooklyn Academy of Music, New York
 2010: Thomas: Hamlet, Opéra de Marseille
 2011: Bernstein: Candide, Staatsoper Berlin
 2011: Bellini: I Capuleti e i Montecchi, Bayerische Staatsoper, Munich, San Francisco Opera (2012)
 2011: Bizet: Carmen, Royal Swedish Opera
 2012: Cilea: Adriana Lecouvreur, Oper Frankfurt
 2012: Strauss: Salome, Theater Sankt Gallen
 2012: Mozart: La finta giardiniera, Aix-en-Provence Festival
 2012: Puccini: Madama Butterfly, Hamburgische Staatsoper
 2013: Handel: Radamisto, Theater an der Wien, Vienna
 2013: Bizet: Les Pêcheurs de perles, Opéra national du Rhin, Strasbourg
 2013: Gluck: Ezio, Oper Frankfurt
 2014: Weill: Rise and Fall of the City of Mahagonny, Staatsoper Berlin
 2014: Donizzeti: La Favorite, Théâtre du Capitole, Toulouse
 2014: Verdi: Un ballo in maschera, Théâtre du Capitole
 2014: Mascagni: L'amico Fritz, Opéra National du Rhin, Strasbourg
 2015: Puccini:  La fanciulla del West, Hamburgische Staatsoper
 2015: Verdi: La traviata, New National Theatre Tokyo
 2015: Massenet: Manon, Lithuanian National Opera, San Francisco Opera (2017), Korea National Opera, Seoul (2018)* 2016: Verdi: Otello, Salzburg Easter Festival
 2016: Wagner: Lohengrin (opera), Theater Sankt Gallen
 2017: Meyerbeer's Le Prophète, Aalto Theatre
 2017: Verdi: Otello, Staatsoper Dresden
 2017: Verdi: Un ballo in maschera, Liceu, Lisbon
 2017: Bellini: I Capuleti e i Montecchi, Lithuanian National Opera
 2018: Bellini: I puritani, Opéra Royal de Wallonie, Liège, and Oper Frankfurt

Shows 
 2002: Christophe, La Route des Mots, Olympia (Victoire de la Musique 2002)
 2004: Alain Bashung, La Tournée des grands espaces Bataclan

Videos and trailers

Shows 
 Excerpt from Alain Bashung's La Tournée des Grands Espaces at the Bataclan in 2004 (Label Barclay Records, genre chanson, 31 titles)
 Les Mots Bleus by Christophe, excerpt from the Olympia 2002 concert, La Route des Mots (Label AZ, genre chanson, 25 titles)

Opera 
Excerpt from Cavalli's performance ofEliogabalo at the Théâtre Royal de La Monnaie in Brussels in 2004] (dir. René Jacobs)
Excerpt from Bellini's I Capuleti e i Montecchi at the San Francisco Opera in 2012] (dir. Riccardo Frizza, set design Vincent Lemaire, costumes Christian Lacroix, Lights Guido Levi) (cast Nicole Cabell (Giulietta), Joyce DiDonato (Romeo), Saimir Pirgu (Tebaldo), Eric Owens (Capellio), Ao Li (Lorenzo))
Excerpt from Verdi's representation of La Traviata at the New National Theatre Tokyo in 2015 (dir. Yves Abel, set design Vincent Lemaire, costumes Vincent Boussard, lights Guido Levi) (cast Bernarda Bobro (Violetta Valery), Antonio Poli (Alfredo Germont), Alfredo Daza (Giorgio Germont), Makiko Yamashita (Flora Bervoix)
 Excerpt from representation of Meyerbeer's The Prophet at the Aalto Theatre of Essen in 2017 (dir. Giuliano Carella], set design, Vincent Lemaire, costumes, Vincent Boussard, Elisabeth de Sauverzac) (cast: John Osborn (Jean de Leyde), Marianne Cornetti (Fidès), Lynette Tapia (Berthe), Martin Ludvik (le comte d’Oberthal), Tijl Faveyts (Zacharie), Pierre Doyen (Mathisen), Albrecht Kludszuweit (Jonas))

References

External links 

 Osterfestspiele Salzburg 2016: Otello de Giuseppe Verdi 27 March 2016 (cond.: Christian Thielemann, staging: Vincent Boussard)
 A Chat with Vincent Boussard sfopera.com 
 Alle Artikel kategorisiert unter "Vincent Boussard" (in German) Neue Musikzeitung
 "

1969 births
Living people
People from Angers
French theatre directors
French opera directors
Chevaliers of the Ordre des Arts et des Lettres